Farīd al-Dīn Masʿūd Ganj-i-Shakar (– 7 May 1266) was a 13th-century Punjabi Sunni Muslim preacher and mystic, who was one of the most revered and distinguished Muslim mystics of the medieval period. He is known reverentially as Bābā Farīd or Shaikh Farīd by Muslims, Hindus and Sikhs of the Punjab Region, or simply as Farīduddīn Ganjshakar.

Biography
Baba Farīd or Fariduddin Masud was born in 1188 (573 AH) in Kothewal, 10 km from Multan in the Punjab region, to Jamāl-ud-dīn Suleimān and Maryam Bībī (Qarsum Bībī), daughter of Wajīh-ud-dīn Khojendī.

He was a Sunni Muslim and was one of the founding fathers of the Chishti Sufi order.
Baba Farid received his early education at Multan, which had become a centre for Muslim education. There he met his teacher Khwaja Qutbuddin Bakhtiar Kaki, who was passing through Multan on his way from Baghdad to Delhi.

Once his education was over, he moved to Delhi, where he learned the Islamic doctrine from his master, Khwaja Qutbuddin Bakhtiar Kaki. He later moved to Hansi, Haryana. When Khwaja Bakhtiyār Kākī died in 1235, Farīd left Hansi and became his spiritual successor, and he settled in Ajodhan (the present Pakpattan, Pakistan) instead of Delhi.

Fariduddin Ganjshakar's shrine darbār is located in Pakpattan, Punjab, Pakistan.

Spiritual lineage
Baba Farīd alleged spiritual lineage of Chishti Order
Muhammad
Ali ibn Abi Talib
Hasan al-Basri
Abdul Waahid Bin Zaid
Fudhail Bin Iyadh
Ibrahim Bin Adham
Huzaifah Al-Mar'ashi Basra
Abu Hubayra al-Basri
Khwaja Mumshad Uluw Al Dīnawarī Dinawar
Abu Ishaq Shamī ( Chishti Name start)
Abu Aḥmad Abdal Chishti
Abu Muḥammad Chishti
Abu Yusuf Bin Saamaan
Maudood Chishti
Shareef Zandani
Usman Harooni
Muinuddin Chishti
Qutbuddin Bakhtiar Kaki 
Fariduddin Ganjshakar

Poetry

Mausoleum

The small Shrine of Baba Farid is made of white marble with two doors, one facing east and called the Nūrī Darwāza or 'Gate of Light', and the second facing north called Bahishtī Darwāza, or 'Gate of Paradise'. There is also a long covered corridor. Inside the tomb are two white marbled graves. One is Baba Farid's, and the other is his elder son's. These graves are always covered by sheets of cloth called Chaddars''' (the green coloured chaddars are covered with Islamic verses), and flowers that are brought by visitors. The space inside the tomb is limited; not more than ten people can be inside at one time. Women are not allowed inside the tomb, but the late Benazir Bhutto, then Prime Minister of Pakistan, was permitted to enter inside by the shrine guardians, when she visited the shrine. Another rare exceptional case was the late Hajjah Kainz Hussain of Jhelum, wife of the late Haji Manzoor Hussain, who was allowed inside the tomb and was given a Chaddar,.

Charity food called Langar is distributed all day to visitors here and the Auqaf Department, which administers the shrine. The shrine is open all day and night for visitors. The shrine has its own huge electricity generator that is used whenever there is power cut or loadshedding, so the shrine remains bright all night, all year round. There is no separation of male and female areas but a small female area is also available. There is a big new mosque in the shrine. Thousands of people daily visit the shrine for their wishes and unresolvable matters; for this they vow to give to some charity when their wishes or problems are resolved.Imperial Gazetteer 1900 When their matters are solved they bring charity food for visitors and the poor, and drop money in big money boxes that are kept for this purpose.Imperial Gazetteer This money is collected by the Auqaf Department of the Government of Pakistan that looks after the shrine.

On 25 October 2010, a bomb exploded outside the gates of the shrine, killing six people.

Baba Farid's Serai in Jerusalem
In great old holy city of Jerusalem, there is a place called Al-Hindi Serai or Indian hospice (Indian lodge or shrine), where it is claimed Baba Farid lived for many years in the early 13th century, almost 800 years ago. Baba Farid walked into Jerusalem around the year 1200, little more than a decade after the armies of Saladin had forced the Crusaders out of Jerusalem. The place is now a pilgrim lodge for people of the Indian sub-continent. It is claimed that this building is currently cared for by the 94-year-old caretaker, Muhammad Munir Ansari, in 2014. "No one knows how long Baba Farid stayed in the city. But long after he had returned to the Punjab, where he eventually became head of the Chishti order, Indian Muslims passing through Jerusalem on their way to Mecca wanted to pray where he had prayed, to sleep where he had slept. Slowly, a shrine and pilgrim lodge, the Indian Hospice, formed around the memory of Baba Farid." "Later accounts of his life said that he spent his days sweeping the stone floors around al-Aqsa mosque, or fasting in the silence of a cave inside the city walls."

Chillas
 A Chilla of Baba Farid is located in Dhirdan village of Lunkaransar tehsil in Bikaner district, Rajasthan, India. 
 Poraha village in Amravati district of Maharashtra, India.
 Niphad a town in  district of Nashik of Maharashtra, India.
 Girad a small town in Samudrapur constituency of Wardha district of Maharashtra, India.
Gadhdevi Singoli town Osmanabad district in Maharashtra india.
 Manegaon a small village situated in Tehsil Barghat, District Seoni, Madhya Pradesh, India. 
 Badchicholi, in Tehsil Pandhurna District Chhindwara, Madhya Pradesh.
 Ajmer dargha sharif, Rajasthan, India.
 Fountain Hillock, Sholashahar, Chittagong, Bangladesh
 The Shrine (mazar/mazār) is vast and spacious, located in the city of Pakpattan, otherwise Pākpattan Sharīf, located in central Punjab province in Pakistan.

A chilla is also found on the top of hill of Donphin nose hill of Visakhapatnam port of Visakhapatnam city in which it is believed that Hazarat Baba Fareed spent some time here, and there is a vast banyan tree in the premises which used to shed sugar in Baba's honour

Death anniversary and Urs
Every year, the saint's death anniversary or Urs is celebrated for six days in the first Islamic month of Muharram, in Pakpattan, Pakistan. The Bahishtī Darwāza (Gate of Paradise) is opened only once a year, during the time of the Urs fair. Hundreds of thousands of pilgrims and visitors from all over the country and the world come to pay homage. The door of the Bahishti Darwaza is made of silver, with floral designs inlaid in gold leaf. This "Gate to Paradise" is padlocked all year, and only opened for five days from sunset to sunrise in the month of Muharram. Some followers believe that by crossing this door all of one's sins are washed away.Tarin, pp 15-16 During the opening of the Gate of Paradise, extensive security arrangements are made to protect people from stampedes. In 2001, 27 people were crushed to death and 100 were injured in a stampede.

Mehfil-e-Sama (Qawwali live concerts)
One of the significant features of the daily life of the shrine is Qawwali.  It is performed all day at some part of the shrine, but at night it attracts a huge gathering. Every Thursday evening, there is a big Mehfil-e-Sama just outside the tomb, that lasts all night and attracts hundreds of people. Many famous and popular Qawwals (Qawwali singers) of the country participate in the Mehfil. Many listeners become so mesmerised that they start dancing a traditional religious dance called Dhamaal. The first Thursday evening of every lunar month attracts extra thousands of people, making the shrine jam packed.

Legacy

As mentioned under Biography above, Baba Farid is considered one of the founding fathers of the Chishti Sufi order. His teacher, Khwaja Bakhtiar Kaki was a disciple of Moinuddin Chishti and Baba Farid's most famous disciple is Nizamuddin Chishti of Delhi, making him an important link in the chain of Chishti masters in South Asia and a very influential spiritual master in South Asia. [See also Honor in Sikhism below.]

One of Farīd's most important contributions to Punjabi literature was his development of the language for literary purposes. Whereas Sanskrit, Arabic, Turkish and Persian had historically been considered the languages of the learned and the elite, and used in monastic centres, Punjabi was generally considered a less refined folk language. Although earlier poets had written in a primitive Punjabi, before Farīd there was little in Punjabi literature apart from traditional and anonymous ballads. By using Punjabi as the language of poetry, Farīd laid the basis for a vernacular Punjabi literature that would be developed later. The English translation of Farid's devotional poetry by Rana Nayar was conferred with Sahitya Akademi Golden Jubilee award in 2007.

The city of Faridkot bears his name. According to legend, Farīd stopped by the city, then named Mokhalpūr, and sat in seclusion for forty days near the fort of King Mokhal. The king was said to be so impressed by his presence that he named the city after Baba Farid, which today is known as Tilla Baba Farid. The festival Bābā Sheikh Farād Āgman Purb Melā' is celebrated in September each year from (21–23 Sep, for 3 days), commemorating his arrival in the city.Tilla Baba Farid The Tribune, 25 September 2007, Retrieved 1 November 2018 Ajodhan was also renamed as Farīd's 'Pāk Pattan', meaning 'Holy Ferry'; today it is generally called Pāk Pattan Sharīf.
In Bangladesh, one of the largest districts of the country Faridpur District was named after him. It is believed that he established his seat in this town.

Faridia Islamic University, a religious madrassa in Sahiwal, Punjab, Pakistan, is named after him, and in July 1998, the Punjab Government in India established the Baba Farid University of Health Sciences at Faridkot, the city which itself was named after him.

There are various explanations of why Baba Farid was given the title Shakar Ganj ('Treasure of Sugar'). One legend says his mother used to encourage the young Farīd to pray by placing sugar under his prayer mat. Once, when she forgot, the young Farīd found the sugar anyway, an experience that gave him more spiritual fervour and led to his being given the name.

One of his descendants was Muhibbullah Allahabadi (1587–1648).

Honor in Sikhism

Baba Farid, as he is commonly known, has his poetry included in the Guru Granth Sahib, the most sacred scripture of Sikhism, which includes 123 (or 134) hymns composed by Farid. Guru Arjan Dev Ji, the 5th guru of Sikhism, included these hymns himself in the Adi Granth, the predecessor of the Guru Granth Sahib. There are 10 Sikh gurus, but there are also 15 Bhagats in Sikhism. Baba Sheikh Farid is one of these equally revered 15 Bhagats.

Langar
Fariduddin Ganjshakar first introduced the institution of the Langar in the Punjab region. The institution greatly contributed to the social fabric of Punjabi society and allowed peoples of various faiths and backgrounds to attain free food and drink. The practice, introduced by Fariduddin Ganjshakar grew and is documented in the Jawahir al-Faridi compiled in 1623 CE. It was later, both the institution and term, adopted by Sikhs.

Commemorative postage stamp
In 1989, on the 800th birth anniversary of Baba Farid, the Pakistan Post Office issued a commemorative postage stamp in his honor.

Places named after him
 Baba Farid University of Health Sciences
Faridpur, Bangladesh
 Faridkot, Punjab, India
 Sheikhsar
 Faridabad, Haryana 

See also
 List of mausolea
 Sufism
 List of Sufi Saints

References

Further reading
 Sheikh Fariduddin Ganj-i-Shakar Ain-e-Akbari by Abul Fazal, English translation, by H. Blochmann and Colonel H. S. Jarrett, 1873–1907. The Asiatic Society of Bengal, Calcutta; Volume III, Saints of India. (Awliyá-i-Hind), page 363.
 Pakpattan and Baba Farid Ganj-i-Shakar, by Muhammad Abdullah Caghtai. Kitab Khana Nauras, 1968.
 Baba Sheikh Farid: Life and teachings, by Gurbachan Singh Talib. Baba Farid Memorial Society, 1973.
 Baba Farid (Makers of Indian literature), by Balwant Singh Anand, Sahitya Akademi, 1975.
 Baba Farid-ud-Din Masud Ganj-i-Shakar, by Jafar Qasimi. Islamic Book Foundation. 1978.
 Sheikh Baba Farid aur unka Kavya, by Jayabhagavan Goyal. 1998, Atmarama & Sons. .
 Savanih hayat Baba Farid Ganj-i Shakar, by Pir Ghulam Dastgir Nami. Madni Kutub Khanah.
 Baba Farid Ganjshakar, by Shabbir Hasan Cishti Nizami. Asthana Book Depot.
 Love is his own power: The slokas of Baba Farid. 1990, .
 Hazrat Baba Farid-ud-Din Masood Ganj Shakar, by Sheikh Parvaiz Amin Naqshbandy. Umar Publications, 1993.
 Baba Farid di dukh–chetana, by Sarawan Singh Paradesi. 1996, Ravi Sahitya Prakashan, .
 Hymns of Sheikh Farid, by Brij Mohan Sagar. South Asia Books, 1999. .
 Sheikh Farid, by Dr. Harbhajan Singh. Hindi Pocket Books, 2002. .
  Great Sufi Poets of the Punjab'' by R. M. Chopra, Iran Society, Kolkata, 1999.

External links
 
 Kalam e Baba Faird (text in shahmukhi- Baba Farid's poetry)
 Kalam e Baba Farid (text in gurmukhi)

1170s births
1266 deaths
Chishtis
Hanafis
Maturidis
Mystic poets
People from Pakpattan
Punjabi Sufi saints
Punjabi-language poets
Punjabi people
Sikh Bhagats
Sufi mystics
Sufi poets